Busytown is a fictional town depicted in several books by American children's author Richard Scarry. Busytown is inhabited by an assortment of anthropomorphic animals, including Huckle Cat, Lowly Worm, Mr. Frumble, police Sergeant Murphy, Mr. Fixit, Bananas Gorilla and Hilda Hippo.

Busytown also refers to the media franchise that spawned from Scarry's books. From the 1970s to the 1980s, Random House, Children's Television Workshop and Jumbo Pictures produced the first basic educational learning animated series called Richard Scarry Presents The Best Series Ever! on home video. In the early 1990s, Cinar produced the animated series The Busy World of Richard Scarry, featuring the inhabitants of Busytown. The series originally aired on Showtime in the United States. A board game and a computer game based on Busytown were also produced in the 1990s. Another animated series centered on Busytown, Busytown Mysteries, ran in the late 2000s.

Characters

Major characters
The most frequently seen characters include:

The Cat Family

Father Cat: Runs a grocery store and is sometimes referred to as Grocer Cat. His first name is John.  He frequently does business with Farmer Alfalfa.  In the cartoon series The Busy World of Richard Scarry, he works as a travel agent. In Busytown Mysteries he works in a food store.
Mother Cat: A housewife and mother who works as a travel agent. She cares for Huckle, Sally, Lowly, and her husband. Mother Cat's first name is Fiona. In the cartoon series The Busy World of Richard Scarry, she works for the town's newspaper. She is absent in Busytown Mysteries.
Huckle Cat: The Cats' school-age son, and the protagonist of the series. He is a lovable young kitten boy who is seven years old. Huckle is often shown in the cockpits of planes and flying with Rudolf von Flugel. It is implied that his ambition is to be a pilot when he grows up. (Huck was the nickname for Scarry's son, Richard Scarry Jr.) Huckle Cat has red spots in The Busy World of Richard Scarry; in Busytown Mysteries and Richard Scarry Presents The Best Series Ever! he is eight years old and has orange spots.
Sally Cat: Huckle's younger sister. She is five years old. In her early appearances she was known as "Little Sister." Sally Cat has red spots in The Busy World of Richard Scarry; in Busytown Mysteries and Richard Scarry Presents The Best Series Ever! she is six years old and has orange spots.
Lowly Worm: Huckle's best friend. He often stays with the Cats as a house guest. Although he attends school with the Cat children, Lowly can also be seen in more adult situations, like driving a street sweeper or working in the operating room of the Busytown Hospital. Lowly Worm has appeared in Richard Scarry Presents The Best Series Ever! where he is mute until The Busy World of Richard Scarry and Busytown Mysteries.
Grandma Cat: Lives in another town and it requires a journey by plane to visit her. She is a skilled driver. She is absent in Busytown Mysteries.
Lily Bunny: A feisty young rabbit kit girl who is one of Huckle Cat's friends and is the protagonist of the counting episode. She likes going on adventures with her friends and likes to do what she likes best. She seems to be seven years old.
Freddie Fox: A young fox kit boy who is one of Huckle's friends. He loves to play games and learn new things. He is six years old.
Rhonda Raccoon: A young raccoon kit girl who is one of Huckle's good friends. She loves to play with Lily Bunny, Hilda Hippo, Freddie Fox and Huckle Cat and go on amazing adventures with them. She is seven years old.
Hilda Hippo: A self-conscious hippopotamus girl who works as a playground monitor at the elementary school. She also has a fairly obvious crush on Lowly. It is also revealed that she's allergic to roses. She is around eight years old.
Mary Mouse: A young mouse pup girl who is six years old and is feisty and imaginative.
Marvin Mouse: Mary's five year old brother who wants to be a mailman when he grows up.
The Pig Family: Father Pig is a house painter married to a housewife, Mother Pig. They have twin children, Harry and Sally.
Able Baker Charlie: A mouse who owns Busytown's bakery. He loves to bake all sorts of things, but he is most famous for baking bread. However, sometimes what he bakes does not always turn out right.
Bananas Gorilla: A gorilla good-guy who can be a thief and whose passion for the fruit that bears his name leads him to steal bunches of them from Grocer Cat, which leads to his pursuit by Sergeant Murphy. Bananas also has many watches on each wrist. He is a very kind gorilla. He is 23 years old. He first appeared in The Great Pie Robbery.
Mr. Fixit: A fox repairman who boasts that he can fix anything, but does not often show this ability. He once attempted to fix Mrs. Cat's vacuum cleaner but it ran on the ceiling instead of the floor. He also fixes a tire on Marvin Mouse's car but the tire deflates. He even fixes Hilda Hippo's toaster but the toaster turns off and two slices of toast went flying.
Miss Honey: A brown bear is the school teacher at Busytown. She is very kind and motherly, and the mother of Kenny Bear. Her pupils include the Cat children and Lowly Worm.
Rudolf von Flugel: A fox pilot who flies a red-coloured German World War I monoplane and dresses in the uniform of a German officer of the time. He often takes Huckle, Lowly and Little Sister up in his planes, though these flights frequently end in disaster. His name is the German word for wing (Flügel). In the United Kingdom editions of the books, his name is Rudolf Strudel.
Sergeant Murphy: A dog police officer and motorcyclist who is often present in street and road scenes. He is married and has a little girl named Bridget. He is dedicated to his job, and his passion for motorcycles is shown in the fact that he wears his crash helmet in bed. His name is a reflection on the stereotypical Irish-American policeman.
Mr. Frumble: A clueless pig who often loses and chases after his hat. He drives a pickle-shaped car and is prone to vehicular accidents. Sometimes he gets traffic tickets from Sergeant Murphy.
Smokey, Sparky and Snozzle: A trio of pig firefighters. Sparky and Snozzle wear a saucepan and colander as headgear, and one of them uses a trombone for a siren.

Minor characters

Mr. Read-a-Lot: An owl who works at the Busytown Library and can often be seen at the front desk.
Beverly Baboon: A baboon who works as Mr. Read-a-Lot's assistant librarian.
Billy Dog: A hound dog who appears to be a bully at first, but has a heart of gold. He is good friends with Huckle, Hilda, and Lowly. He later gets glasses and usually wears a red sweater. He is about six years old.
Bully Bobcat: A bobcat who works for the town's newspaper.
Cassie: A grey cat appearing in The Busy World of Richard Scarry.                 
Doctor Lion: A lion doctor who runs both a private practice and works at the Busytown Hospital and is the primary health care provider for most of the citizens.
Farmer Alfalfa: A goat who owns a farm in the outskirts of Busytown and specializes in growing corn.  Non-conscientious drivers can often be seen driving through his fields. (He may have been named after a Terrytoons character of the same name.)
Farmer Patrick Pig: A farmer pig who resides on the outskirts of Busytown. He grows corn and wheat.
Farmer Fox: A farmer fox who resides on the outskirts of Busytown.  He also works at a farm stand.
Fred: A squid who runs a fish and chips business.
Fireman Ralph: A pig firefighter who is the chief and leader of the crew at the Busytown Fire Station.
Goldbug: A cricket who works as a roving news reporter for the Busytown Action Bug News and drives a small yellow van, appearing in Busytown Mysteries.
Mr. Gronkle: An elderly and grouchy warthog who isn't fond of children. He is rarely compassionate and wants things to go his way. Despite his flaws, he sometimes shows a soft side.
Mr. Humperdink: A pig who works Busytown's bakery, appearing in Richard Scarry's Best Busy People Video Ever and The Busy World of Richard Scarry.
Janitor Joe: A fox who is a janitor in most places of Busytown, including, the theatre and Huckle's school.
Jason the Mason: A pig mason who specializes in building brick foundations and chimneys.  Although skilled at his trade, he is somewhat clumsy.
John Parr Miller: A terrier at the town party, apparently a chef, named after a Disney animator who then moved into illustration of children's books.
Mayor Fox:  A fox and the Mayor of Busytown. He always wears a monocle, top hat and a ribbon of office.
Ngorongoro Crater: A hyena who is a photographer and whose camera gets a parking ticket.
Nurse Nelly: A cat nurse who often works as Dr. Lion's assistant both at his office and in the hospital.
Pig-Will and Pig-Won't: Two pig brothers around age 6 who drive a sausage shaped car and are friends of Huckle and Sally.  Pig-Will wears a green shirt and/or green overalls and Pig-Won't wears a red shirt/blue overalls. Pig-Will's catchphrase is, "I will! I will!" Pig-Won't's catchphrase is, "I won't."
Postman Pig: A pig letter carrier.  Although not the only carrier in Busytown, his route includes the Cat family's home.
P.S. Pig: A pig letter carrier, appearing in The Busy World of Richard Scarry.
Mr. Raccoon: A raccoon who works at the cafeteria shop, appearing in The Busy World of Richard Scarry.
Raffles Rat: A rat thief who uses convoluted schemes and elaborate disguises to commit crimes.  He may work alone or with a partner and is especially fond of stealing jewelry.
Mr. Root: An armadillo who works at the community garden. He can be a bit demanding.
Sawdust the Carpenter: A cat carpenter who builds houses.  He sometimes works alone and sometimes with several apprentices.
Vanderbuilt: A young warthog and nephew to Mr. Gronkle. 
Wolfgang Wolf, Benny Baboon and Harry Hyena: A trio of layabouts who spend their time lazing in the sun or eating or getting into trouble. On one occasion they were deemed suitable enough to fly to the moon (with Lowly as a passenger).

References

Fictional populated places
Series of books